John Arthur Jympson (16 September 1930 – 3 June 2003) was a British film editor. He edited films such as Zulu (1964), A Hard Day's Night (1964), Kaleidoscope (1966), Frenzy (1972) and A Fish Called Wanda (1988).

Career
Jympson was born on 16 September 1930 in London. He attended Dulwich College and left aged 17 in 1947 intending to become a veterinary surgeon. His father, Jympson Harman, the film critic for The Evening News, secured him a position as a runner at Ealing Studios. He worked in the cutting-room, aiding Peter Tanner on the 1949 film Kind Hearts and Coronets, before participating in two years of National Service. He returned to Ealing and worked on the films The Cruel Sea (1953) and The Ladykillers (1955). Jympson became an assembly cutter on I Was Monty's Double in 1958.

His break came in 1959 while working under William Hornbeck on Suddenly, Last Summer where his work earned him the credit of assembly editor. The film's success and a recommendation from Max Benedict meant Jympson was hired to edit films himself for the first time, namely A French Mistress and Suspect in 1960, each for the Boulting brothers. Jympson met actor and producer Stanley Baker when editing the 1962 film A Prize of Arms; the two worked together on The Man Who Finally Died and 1964's Zulu, which Tony Sloman called Jympson's "career-high" saying the film was "magnificently edited". He followed this up with a further success, A Hard Day's Night, a film starring the Beatles, was released to critical acclaim. The film's editing style has been strongly praised and is considered highly influential.

James B. Harris picked Jympson to edit his directorial debut The Bedford Incident in 1965, the year he also edited Sands of the Kalahari. He edited Where Eagles Dare (1968) and aided the film's director Brian G. Hutton on set. Jympson edited Kelly's Heroes (1970), and the Peter Sellers' films The Bobo (1967) and The Optimists of Nine Elms (1973). Alfred Hitchcock selected Jympson to edit Frenzy in 1972; off set the two became good friends.

In 1976 Jympson was hired to edit Star Wars (1977) by director George Lucas, as Lucas liked Jympson's work on A Hard Day's Night. However after an initial cut, Jympson was replaced by Paul Hirsch, Richard Chew and Marcia Lucas, with Lucas himself also editing chunks of the film to get it back in a state that he wanted the film to be cut in. According to reports, Jympson's edit contained about 30-40% different footage from the film's final version.<ref>{{cite news|title=The Lost Cut of Star Wars|work=Star Wars Insider|issue=41|year=1998|author=Reynolds, David West}}</ref>Little Shop of Horrors (1986), A Fish Called Wanda (1988), HouseSitter (1992), Splitting Heirs (1993), Circle of Friends (1995), Haunted (1995) and In and Out (1997) were some of Jympson's later editing projects. Sloman says A Fish Called Wanda was "probably the biggest success of his career." Jympson received a BAFTA nomination for his editing of the film. His final film was 1999's Mad Cows.

Personal life
Jympson married Maureen Hemsworth, a costume department worker at Ealing, in 1954. He suffered a stroke before editing his final film, Mad Cows'', and later had both of his legs amputated due to diabetes. He died on 3 June 2003.

Filmography

Films
All as editor unless stated

Television

References
Footnotes

Bibliography

External links

1930 births
2003 deaths
British film editors
Film people from London
People educated at Dulwich College